Krasnokamenka (roughly translated as "red stone settlement") is a village in Uysky District of Chelyabinsk Oblast, Russia.  Postal code: 456476.

References

External links
A picture of the church in Krasnokamenka 
Information about Krasnokamenka on geody.com 

Rural localities in Chelyabinsk Oblast